Renan Freire da Purificação (born November 27, 1991) is a Brazilian volleyball player who plays for Sporting CP.

References

1991 births
Living people
Brazilian sportspeople
Brazilian men's volleyball players
Sporting CP volleyball players
Volleyball players from Rio de Janeiro (city)